Luk krung (literally "child of the city"), also called phleng luk krung (เพลงลูกกรุง), is a genre of Thai popular music. It is a more polished, urban style, compared to its folk music counterpart, luk thung. Luk krung songs commonly feature themes about feelings of society, people in the capital and occurrences that happen in the period of time. The emotions, the singing, the tone of singer, the songwriter and musicians all form to create an exquisite, delicate and gentle sound. The style of the music and lyrics are similar to poetry and the meaning of lyrics is complex.

History 
Luk Krung was first established around 1931, during the reign of King Rama VII, in which Thailand was going through a regime change. Some people told the end of period of King Rama VI around 1912, an Italian musician was employed to bring string instruments to Thailand in order to teach Thai people to play them. Luk Krung became famous around 1932. The melody of song King Rama VI and the song “La tee kluaymai” of Khun Wichitmatra which had a rumba rhythm was brought to be played with Luk Krung style.

The first and most famous luk krung group was the Suntharaphon band (วงดนตรีสุนทราภรณ์). In 1939,The Suntharaphon band was established and became a big band which made the society of that period begin to listen to music. Listeners and record labels began to classify the music into groups, created singers that looked more like the people in city. Musicians, songwriters and singers had a new fashion about their clothes. There were clubs and bars at Ratdamnern road for playing the music. The hotels also had a ballroom in order to play Luk Krung music. After that, Luk Krung song had the comparison with Luk Thung song.

Luk Krung Artists

 Suntaraphorn (Thai Luk Krung band)
 Eua Sunthornsanan
 Suthep Wongkamhaeng
 Charin Nanthanakhorn
 Narit Aree
 Dimpossible (Thai Luk Krung band)
 Settra Sirachaya
 Rewat Buddhinan
 Orawee Sujjanon
 Pensri Poomchoosri
 Kittikhun Chiansong
 Pause (Thai Luk Krung band)
 Amarin Ruengboriboon
 Patchara Wangwan

References

 
Thai styles of music